The 2001 National Lacrosse League season is the 15th season in the NLL that began on December 21, 2000 and concluded with the championship game on April 27, 2001. The Philadelphia Wings won their 6th NLL championship, defeating the Toronto Rock 9-8 in Toronto. Philadelphia had now won twice as many championships as any other team in NLL history (the Buffalo Bandits had won three, and the Rock two). The Championship game was one of only two games (out of ten) the Rock lost at home during the 2001 season, and ended Toronto's bid for an unprecedented third straight Championship.

The NLL expanded its schedule from 12 games to 14 during this season.

The lowest-scoring game in NLL history happened during the 2001 season, as the Toronto Rock and Albany Attack combined for only 11 goals in a 7-4 Toronto win at the Air Canada Centre.

Team movement
For the 2001 season, one expansion team was added to the NLL, the Columbus Landsharks. In addition, the Syracuse Smash ended a dismal existence (dead last in the standings for three straight years) in Syracuse, moving to Ottawa, Ontario to become the Rebel. Unfortunately, the Rebel would finish in the basement three straight years as well. The Pittsburgh CrosseFire, formerly the Baltimore Thunder, moved again, this time to Washington, becoming the Washington Power.

In addition, the Toronto Rock moved from the aging Maple Leaf Gardens to the Air Canada Centre for the 2001 season. The first Rock game at the ACC was a 17-7 Toronto win over the Ottawa Rebel on the opening night of the season, December 21, 2000.

Regular season

All Star Game
No All-Star game was held in 2001.

Playoffs

Awards

Weekly awards
Each week, a player is awarded "Player of the Week" honours.

Monthly awards
Awards are also given out monthly for the best overall player and best rookie.

Statistics leaders
Bold numbers indicate new single-season records. Italics indicate tied single-season records.

See also
 2001 in sports

References

External links
 2001 Archive at the Outsider's Guide to the NLL

01
National Lacrosse League